Studio Electronics is a manufacturer of analog synthesizers and other music equipment. The company was founded in 1981 and is based in the United States. Formerly, the company rackmounted synthesizers such as the Minimoog, Sequential Circuits Prophet-5 and Oberheim OB-8. In 2017, Studio Electronics collaborated with Roland in the development of the Roland SE-02, a three oscillator analog synthesizer.

Product history

 
Midimoog (1989)
ATC-1 (1996-7)
SE-1/SE-1X (1993/2000)
ATC-X (2003)
Modmax series (2004)
Omega 8 (2004)
Boomstar series (2014)
Quadnic (2016)
Tonestar 2600 (2016)

References

External links

Official website

Electronics companies established in 1981
American companies established in 1981
Synthesizer manufacturing companies of the United States